Phlegmacium balteaticlavatus is a species of fungus in the family Cortinariaceae.

Taxonomy 
It was originally described in 2014 and placed in the large mushroom genus Cortinarius (subgenus Phlegmacium).

In 2022 the species was transferred from Cortinarius and reclassified as Phlegmacium balteaticlavatus based on genomic data.

Habitat and distribution 
The species is found in Finland, where it grows in mixed forests with trees such as birch, poplar, willow, spruce, and pine. Fruitbodies occur from mid-August to mid-September.

Etymology 
The specific epithet balteaticlavatus refers to both its affinity to C. balteatus and its club-shaped (clavate) stipe.

See also
List of Cortinarius species

References

External links

balteaticlavatus
Fungi described in 2014
Fungi of Finland